Ian Candlish Kirkwood, Lord Kirkwood (8 June 1932 – 22 April 2017) QC was a Senator of the College of Justice of the Supreme Courts of Scotland. He was appointed to the Inner House (Scotland's main appellate court) in 1987.

Early life
Son of solicitor John Brown Kirkwood, OBE, and Constance, Lord Kirkwood was educated at George Watson's College, Edinburgh. He went on to study at University of Edinburgh (MA, LLB) and Michigan University (LLM). He became Queen's Counsel in 1970.

Legal career
He served on the Parole Board for Scotland from 1994 to 1997. Kirkwood was one of five judges selected to hear the appeal of convicted Lockerbie bomber Abdelbaset al-Megrahi.

Other
Kirkwood was patron of Edinburgh Chess Club and Chess Scotland.

See also
List of Senators of the College of Justice

References

1932 births
2017 deaths
Scottish chess players
Kirkwood
Scottish King's Counsel
People educated at George Watson's College
Alumni of the University of Edinburgh
Michigan State University alumni